Sarita Tirkey is a female Indian international lawn bowler.

Bowls career

World Championships
In 2020 she was selected for the 2020 World Outdoor Bowls Championship in Australia.

Asia Pacific
Tirkey won a bronze medal in the triples with Tania Choudhury and Rupa Rani Tirkey, at the 2019 Asia Pacific Bowls Championships, held in the Gold Coast, Queensland.

References

Indian bowls players
Living people
Year of birth missing (living people)